Adelaide Thunderbirds are an Australian netball team based in Adelaide, South Australia. Since 2017 they have played in Suncorp Super Netball. Between 2008 and 2016, they played in the ANZ Championship and between 1997 and 2007, they played in the Commonwealth Bank Trophy league. Thunderbirds have won four premierships. They won their first two premierships in 1998 and 1999 during the Commonwealth Bank Trophy era and their third and fourth in 2010 and 2013 during ANZ Championship era. Historically, Thunderbirds are one of Australia's most successful netball teams. Between 1997 and 2010 they finished in the top three of every regular season.

History

Commonwealth Bank Trophy
Between 1997 and 2007, Adelaide Thunderbirds played in the Commonwealth Bank Trophy league. Together with Adelaide Ravens, Melbourne Kestrels, Melbourne Phoenix, Perth Orioles, Queensland Firebirds, Sydney Sandpipers and Sydney Swifts, Thunderbirds were one of the founding members of the league. Thunderbirds were initially going to be named Adelaide Falcons but the name was changed at the request of the rugby union team.
Adelaide Thunderbirds and Adelaide Ravens represented Netball South Australia and each team was assigned four state league clubs to select players from. Thunderbirds were aligned with Cheerio, Contax, Matrics and Oakdale. With a team coached by former Contax head coach, Margaret Angove and a starting seven featuring Rebecca Sanders, Kathryn Harby-Williams, Jacqui Delaney, Sarah Sutter, Peta Squire, Cassie Mogg and Alex Hodge, Thunderbirds won their first two premierships and grand finals in 1998 and 1999.

Regular season statistics

ANZ Championship
Between 2008 and 2016, Thunderbirds played in the ANZ Championship. Natalie von Bertouch became the inaugural ANZ Championship Thunderbirds captain. She subsequently captained Thunderbirds to two ANZ Championship titles. In 2010, after finishing second during the regular season, they defeated the minor premiers, New South Wales Swifts, in the major semi-final and Waikato Bay of Plenty Magic in the grand final. In 2013, Natalie von Bertouch captained Thunderbirds to their fourth premiership after they defeated Queensland Firebirds in the grand final.

Regular season statistics

Suncorp Super Netball
Since 2017, Thunderbirds have played in Suncorp Super Netball. They have been an unsuccessful franchise as of 2022, having not yet made finals or finished higher than 7th place.

Regular season statistics

Grand finals
Commonwealth Bank Trophy 

ANZ Championship

Home venues
Thunderbirds have played the majority of their home games at the Netball SA Stadium. Due to sponsorship arrangements this venue has also be known as ETSA Park or Priceline Stadium. Thunderbirds have also played home games, including the 2010 and 2013 grand finals, at the Adelaide Entertainment Centre. Thunderbirds have also played home games at the Adelaide Arena. Thunderbirds played a 2019 Suncorp Super Netball Round 7 home match against Sunshine Coast Lightning at the Territory Netball Stadium.

Team colours
During the Commonwealth Bank Trophy era, Thunderbirds main colour was silver. Between 2008 and 2010, when Thundersbirds were sponsored by Port Adelaide Football Club, they adopted their sponsors team colours of black, white, teal and silver. Ahead of the 2011 season, Thunderbirds announced they were changing their team colours to pink.

Logos

Notable players

2023 squad

Internationals

 Carla Borrego
 Shimona Nelson
 Shamera Sterling
 Latanya Wilson

 Leana de Bruin
 Maria Folau
 Cathrine Latu

 Cathrine Latu

 Fiona Themann

Captains

Coaches
Head Coaches

Assistant coaches

Specialist coaches

Main sponsors

Premierships
ANZ Championship
Winners: 2010, 2013
Runners Up: 2009
Commonwealth Bank Trophy
Winners: 1998, 1999
Runners Up: 1997, 2000, 2001, 2002, 2006

Southern Force

Southern Force are the reserve team of Thunderbirds. They play in the Australian Netball League. In 2012 they were ANL Champions.

References

External links
  Adelaide Thunderbirds on Facebook
  Adelaide Thunderbirds on Twitter

 
ANZ Championship teams
Commonwealth Bank Trophy teams
1997 establishments in Australia
Sports clubs established in 1997
Sporting clubs in Adelaide
Suncorp Super Netball teams
Netball teams in South Australia
Netball teams in Australia